New Zealand rock band The Clean have released five studio albums, two live albums, three compilation albums, five extended play records, and three singles. The band's first official release was their "Tally Ho!" single in 1981, released on the Flying Nun label.

Albums

Studio albums

Live albums

Compilation albums

Demo albums

Extended plays

Singles

References

External links
Anything Could Happen (The Clean discography)
 

Discographies of New Zealand artists